Abul Kasim is a mountain in southeastern Ethiopia. It is the highest point in Seru woreda.

Although this mountain has great importance to Oromo cultural and religious tradition as the home of the Abba Muda, it is also important as the location of the tomb of a descendant of the Muslim saint Sheikh Hussein, and is the object of an annual pilgrimage. Trimingham describes the tomb as "covered with glass beads and ornaments of copper and brass. Similar ornament are to be seen on some trees in the forest, and no visitors would dare touch these holy objects."

Notes 

Mountains of Ethiopia
Geography of Oromia Region